Krida Stadium is a football stadium in the town of Rembang, Rembang Regency, Central Java, Indonesia. The stadium has a capacity of 10,000 people.

It is the home base of PSIR Rembang .

References

Sports venues in Indonesia
Football venues in Indonesia